RFFE may refer to:

 RF Front-End Working Group (RFFE) of the MIPI Alliance
 Escherichia coli (E. coli) rffE strain (rffE), with mutant defective UDP-N-acetylglucosamine 2-epimerase

See also

 RFE (disambiguation)